Black Panther: Wakanda Forever is a 2022 American superhero film based on the Marvel Comics character Black Panther. Produced by Marvel Studios and distributed by Walt Disney Studios Motion Pictures, it is the sequel to Black Panther (2018) and the 30th film in the Marvel Cinematic Universe (MCU). Directed by Ryan Coogler, who co-wrote the screenplay with Joe Robert Cole, the film stars Letitia Wright as Shuri / Black Panther, alongside Lupita Nyong'o, Danai Gurira, Winston Duke, Florence Kasumba, Dominique Thorne, Michaela Coel, Tenoch Huerta Mejía, Martin Freeman, Julia Louis-Dreyfus, and Angela Bassett. In the film, the leaders of Wakanda fight to protect their nation in the wake of King T'Challa's death.

The film premiered at the El Capitan Theatre in Los Angeles on October 26, 2022, and was released theatrically in the United States on November 11, 2022. Black Panther: Wakanda Forever has grossed over $837 million worldwide, becoming the sixth highest-grossing film of 2022. Rotten Tomatoes, a review aggregator, surveyed 417 reviews and judged 84% of them to be positive. Metacritic calculated a weighted average score of 67 out of 100 based on 62 reviews, indicating "generally favorable reviews".

Black Panther: Wakanda Forever has garnered numerous awards and nominations with most nominations recognizing the film itself, acting, costume design, production values, and soundtrack. Bassett received widespread acclaim for her performance as Queen Ramonda, for which she won the Golden Globe Award for Best Supporting Actress. She became the first actress to win a major individual acting award for a Marvel film. The film was nominated for five Academy Awards, one British Academy Film Award, six Critics' Choice Movie Awards (winning two), two Golden Globe Awards (winning one), and two Screen Actors Guild Awards.



Accolades

References

External links 
 

Accolades
Accolades
Black Panther: Wakanda Forever
Marvel Cinematic Universe: Phase Four